Doraemon Story of Seasons is a farming simulation role-playing video game developed by Brownies and Marvelous and published by Bandai Namco Entertainment for Nintendo Switch and Windows. It is a crossover of the Story of Seasons video game series and the Doraemon franchise. The title's release marks the first release of a Doraemon video game to international audiences.

The game was released on June 13, 2019 in Japan, and worldwide on October 11, 2019. The PlayStation 4 version of the game was released on July 30, 2020 in Japan, and worldwide on September 4, 2020. A sequel, was released worldwide for Nintendo Switch, PlayStation 5, and Windows on November 2, 2022.

Development 
In an interview with Famitsu, it is revealed that Doraemon Story of Seasons was a proposal from Bandai Namco producer Kenji Nakajima to Marvelous, as he is a fan of Marvelous’ Story of Seasons series. He grew up while watching Doraemon, and he is also a fan of the Harvest Moon: Back to Nature game. He wants to create a game that lets players experience the messages and type of story Doraemon tells, with the gameplay elements of Story of Seasons that properly reward the player's efforts.

He also confirmed that the game will not have any romance or marriage features, which is different from the classic Story of Seasons series. In exchange for this, the game will feature a linear story with a focus on familial love. There are also multiple sub-stories that will also be related to familial love, such as between siblings or for family pets. There are many family-run shops in town with its own sub-story that will be connected to the relationship system. The theme of familial love is explored further as Nobita's friends such as Shizuka and Gian are helping out at the stores.

During the interview, Story of Seasons production director Hikaru Nakano also revealed that Marvelous is also working on another Story of Seasons game simultaneously, and Doraemon Story of Seasons will help to expand the Story of Seasons series even further.

Release 
The game was first announced during a Nintendo Direct presentation on February 14, 2019 in Japan accompanied by a teaser trailer featuring basic gameplay. Bandai Namco announced the official release date of June 13, 2019 though a press release in April. A downloadable demo for Nintendo Switch was later released in Japan in May along with a new trailer.

In a separate announcement in April, Bandai Namco Entertainment Asia and Korea announced a Traditional Chinese and Korean version of the game, which will be released in Summer 2019. They also announced a Windows version of the game, which will be released through Steam. A follow-up announcement by Bandai Namco also confirmed the release of an English version the game in North America, Europe and Southeast Asia. The game will be released physically in Europe and Southeast Asia, and digital-only in North America.

In April 2020, it was announced that the game would be released for PlayStation 4 in Japan on July 30, 2020, and worldwide on September 4, 2020. The PlayStation 4 version will run at 60fps instead usual 30fps in Switch. It can also be played in PlayStation 5 but with better and faster performance.

In August 2022, it was announced that the sequel would launch in Japan for Nintendo Switch, PlayStation 5, and Windows on November 2, 2022.

Gameplay 
The game combines the farming simulation elements from the Story of Seasons series and the familiar characters and secret gadgets from the Doraemon series. The player will play as Nobita and participate in farming activities such as plowing the fields to grow crops, taking care of cattle and sheep, and more. The game also has a fishing system, a house decoration system, an insects capture-and-collect system, holidays and festivals similar to the Story of Seasons games.

Characters from the Doraemon series such as Gian, Suneo and Shizuka (who were part of the main cast) also show up as supporting characters and will assist Nobita in his adventures. By advancing the story, Nobita can unlock gadgets that grant special abilities such as Weather Cards which can change tomorrow's weather and the Anywhere Door which allows Nobita to fast-travel between areas.

A demo of the game is downloadable, and allows the user to play until a certain date, where it will then show a screen saying “Thanks for playing”. Only the very beginning of the game is compromised, and the rest is playable until its time limit.

Plot 
After planting a mysterious seed found by Nobita, Doraemon and friends are transported to another world, into a place called Shizen Town. During the process, Doraemon lost most of his secret gadgets that will help them to return. In the end, they decided to stay in Shizen Town while trying to find a way to get back to their original world. Lunch, a Shizen Town resident, lends Nobita a farm in town for him to stay.

Reception 

Doraemon Story of Seasons received "mixed or average" reviews for PlayStation 4 and "generally favorable" reviews for the Switch.

IGN heavily criticized the game for feeling like work, describing its gameplay as tedious and antiquated and its dialogue as "...time-consuming, meandering, and weird", while praising the game's world for looking "like a page ripped from a child's storybook". Nintendo Life praised the game's simplicity and repetitiveness for being rewarding and described its art style as "gorgeous" while criticizing its slow pace and reliance on grinding in order to progress. Nintendo World Report praised the gameplay and its accessibility while criticizing choppiness present in the graphics and the overwhelming amount of text in the game.

Notes

References

External links

2019 video games
Bandai Namco games
Doraemon video games
Nintendo Switch games
Marvelous Entertainment
Video games developed in Japan
Windows games
Video games related to anime and manga
PlayStation 4 games
Crossover video games
Role-playing video games
Single-player video games
Story of Seasons spin-off games